Coombs' method or the Coombs rule is a ranked voting system which uses a ballot counting method for ranked voting created by Clyde Coombs. The Coombs' method is the application of Coombs rule to single-winner elections, similarly to instant-runoff voting, it uses candidate elimination and redistribution of votes cast for that candidate until one candidate has a majority of votes.

Procedures
Each voter rank-orders all of the candidates on their ballot. If at any time one candidate is ranked first (among non-eliminated candidates) by an absolute majority of the voters, that candidate wins. Otherwise, the candidate ranked last (again among non-eliminated candidates) by the largest number of (or a plurality of) voters is eliminated. Conversely, under instant-runoff voting, the candidate ranked first (among non-eliminated candidates) by the fewest voters is eliminated.

In some sources, the elimination proceeds regardless of whether any candidate is ranked first by a majority of voters, and the last candidate to be eliminated is the winner.  This variant of the method can result in a different winner than the former one (unlike in instant-runoff voting, where checking to see if any candidate is ranked first by a majority of voters is only a shortcut that does not affect the outcome).

An example

Assuming all of the voters vote sincerely (strategic voting is discussed below), the results would be as follows, by percentage:

 In the first round, no candidate has an absolute majority of first-place votes (51).
 Memphis, having the most last-place votes (26+15+17=58), is therefore eliminated.
 In the second round, Memphis is out of the running, and so must be factored out. Memphis was ranked first on Group A's ballots, so the second choice of Group A, Nashville, gets an additional 42 first-place votes, giving it an absolute majority of first-place votes (68 versus 15+17=32), and making it the winner.
 Note that the last-place votes are only used to eliminate a candidate in a voting round where no candidate achieves an absolute majority; they are disregarded in a round where any candidate has 51% or more. Thus last-place votes play no role in the final round.

Use 
The voting rounds used in the reality television program Survivor could be considered a variation of Coombs' method, with sequential voting rounds. Everyone votes for one candidate they support for elimination each round, and the candidate with a plurality of that vote is eliminated. A strategy difference is that sequential rounds of voting means the elimination choice is fixed in a ranked ballot Coombs' method until that candidate is eliminated.

Potential for strategic voting
The Coombs' method is vulnerable to three tactical voting strategies: compromising, push-over, and teaming. Coombs is sensitive to incomplete ballots, and how voters fill in the bottom of their ballots makes a big difference.

See also
 List of democracy and elections-related topics

Notes

Single-winner electoral systems
Non-monotonic electoral systems
Preferential electoral systems